Dmitry Nikolayevich Kobylkin (born 7 July 1971 in Astrakhan) is a Russian politician who served as Governor of Yamalo-Nenets Autonomous Okrug from 4 May 2012 until 29 May 2018. and as Minister of Natural Resources of the Russian Federation since May 2018 until November 2020.

Biography 
Born July 7, 1971 in Astrakhan.

1993: Graduated from the Ufa Oil Institute specialising in mining engineering and geophysics.

2003: Graduated from the occupational retraining institute at the Ural Academy of Public Administration specialising in State and Municipal Management.

1994-1995: Geologist with the Tarkosalinskoye oil and gas exploration expedition.

1996-2001: Personnel Director, First Deputy General Director at Purneftegazgeologiya. Starting in 2000, led the development of the Khancheiskoye field and managed oil and gas exploration there.

May 2001: Appointed General Director of Khancheineftegaz.

From 2002: First Deputy Head of the Administration of the Purovsky District, Yamal-Nenets Autonomous Area.

2005: Elected Head of the Purovsky District.

2009: Included in the personnel pool of the President of the Russian Federation.

March 2010: Nominated by the Russian President and confirmed as Governor of the Yamal-Nenets Autonomous Area by the region's Legislative Assembly.

March 12, 2015: Appointed Acting Governor of the Yamal-Nenets Autonomous Area by Presidential Executive Order.

October 1, 2015: Elected Governor of the Yamal-Nenets Autonomous Area by the region's Legislative Assembly.

May 18, 2018: Appointed Minister of Natural Resources and Environment by Presidential Executive Order and re-appointed on 21 January 2020 in Mikhail Mishustin's Cabinet.

Married, with three children.

Sanctions
In December 2022 the EU sanctioned Dmitry Kobylkin in relation to the 2022 Russian invasion of Ukraine.

References

External links
Official Website

1971 births
People from Astrakhan
United Russia politicians
21st-century Russian politicians
Governors of Yamalo-Nenets Autonomous Okrug
Living people
Russian engineers
Russian geophysicists
Eighth convocation members of the State Duma (Russian Federation)